James Garrison (born 1953 in Ridgeway, Pennsylvania) is an American architect and educator who lives, practices, and teaches in Brooklyn, New York.  He has two children, Emma Garrison, a marine biologist, and Brendan Garrison, a writer.

Growing up in western Pennsylvania, Garrison witnessed nature destroyed by surface mining and clear-cutting. This led to his continuing dedication to ecological protection and an even greater understanding of sustainability in architecture. In 1971, James attended the Syracuse University School of Architecture and there researched new forms of urban housing under the mentorship of Werner Seligman, graduating with design honors. While at Syracuse, he apprenticed with modernists Lewis Skoler and Kermit Lee who conveyed a strong progressive ethos for architecture and society.

Garrison joined James Stewart Polshek and Associates, NYC, in 1978 becoming a partner in the succeeding firm, the Polshek Partnership, in 1989. He began to teach and conduct research in building design and technology at Columbia University in 1984 where he taught core studios and directed the architectural technology curriculum until 1992. He has taught at the Pratt Institute since 2008 concentrating on core graduate studios and specialized seminar investigations into industrialized building systems and sustainability.

After the rapid growth of Polshek and Partners in the 1980s Garrison established Garrison Architects, a studio-based practice that seeks to create a synthesis of art, sustainability, and engineering. Garrison Architects practice is purposefully diverse with regard to program, scale, material and form. The work is guided by the conviction that the architect must understand and control the building process from design through construction. Valuing craftsmanship as well as digital precision Garrison looks to embrace the human connection to makeing, whether the building of masonry or assembling prefabricated components. This approach includes prefabrication, climate-specific design, solar-induced ventilation, embodied energy reduction and net zero programs for energy, waste, and water. Work in prefabrication has focused on volumetric modular structures and includes the use of industrial design and engineering methods to create sustainable, affordable and highly evolved architectural systems.

Garrison's first building to gain national recognition was 500 Park Avenue, designed while he was with James Stewart Polshek and Associates. It drew on his academic work as it sought to demonstrate the potential for modern architecture to re-integrate the fabric of the city. Located at 59th Street and Park Avenue in Manhattan, it synthesized the glass architecture of the post-war era with the masonry of the surrounding pre-war apartment houses. It was heralded by Ada Louise Huxtable as an exemplar of contextual design and received an honor award from the American Institute of Architects.

In 2008 Garrison Architects received the commission to design the Syracuse University School of Architecture. With 34 extremely involved faculty, a very limited budget, and a damaged but promising early 20th century building it presented a significant challenge. The design process unfolded with an analysis to discover how the building might foster identity and communication while increasing the school's visibility in the surrounding University. This process also revealed the buildings abandoned solar actuated ventilation system and has led to the greater understanding and use of this approach. Garrison Architects was awarded a NYC AIA design award for this project.

The Pod Hotel, completed in 2018 in Williamsburg, Brooklyn, is the firms largest and most complex modular building to date. It places 250 prefabricated modular micro hotel rooms, restaurants, and commercial space within an irregular urban site. The design includes seven interconnected garden courts and four green rooftop terraces with photovoltaic canopies.

Garrison Architects completed works also include U.S. Principal Officers Residence in Samoa, the Irish Repertory Theatre, NYC, NY, the East Elmhurst Branch Library, Queens, NY, Roberto Clemente Plaza, Bronx, NY, the Iversen Kaplan Residence, Princeton, NJ, and Restoration Plaza in Bedford Stuyvesant, Brooklyn, NY.

Modular structures include the NYC Emergency Housing Prototype for the Office of Emergency Management; the NYC Parks Beach Restoration Modules, mobile drone control and observation modules for Verizon Communications, the Lehman College Child Care Center, and the Milan Case Study Houses.

Work in production and construction in the fall of 2020 includes the Staten Island Animal Shelter, Staten Island, NY, Newark Makerhoods, Newark, NJ, the Piaule Landscape Hotel, Catskill, NY, Lighthouse Point, Staten Island, NY, The 76 Modular Triple Net Zero Housing, Albany, NY, the Aspinwall/Willich Residence, Hudson, NY and the Lavrik/Paprocki Residence, Milan, NY.

External links 
 "Towards a Sustainable Architecture" by James Garrison, in Scapes 2005
 Garrison Architects Homepage
 Modern Modular Architect blog by Garrison Architects
 James Garrison Homepage at Parsons
 "Renowned Architect Designs With Nature in Mind," Real Estate Weekly

Syracuse University School of Architecture alumni
1953 births
Living people
Architects from New York City
Architects from Pennsylvania
Parsons School of Design faculty